Chloroglyphica is a genus of moths in the family Geometridae.

Species
 Chloroglyphica devecisi (Herbulot, 1992)
 Chloroglyphica variegata (Butler, 1889)
 Chloroglyphica xeromeris (Prout, 1932)

References
 Chloroglyphica at Markku Savela's Lepidoptera and Some Other Life Forms
 Natural History Museum Lepidoptera genus database

Geometrinae